Effi Briest is a 2009 German drama film directed by Hermine Huntgeburth. It is based on the 1895 novel Effi Briest by Theodor Fontane.

Cast 
 Julia Jentsch as Effi von Briest
 Sebastian Koch as Geert von Instetten
 Mišel Matičević as Major Crampas
  as Roswitha
 Barbara Auer as Johanna
 Juliane Köhler as Luise von Briest
 Thomas Thieme as Herr von Briest
 Rüdiger Vogler as Gieshübler
 Ludwig Blochberger as Nienkerken

References

External links 

2009 drama films
2009 films
2000s German-language films
German drama films
Films based on works by Theodor Fontane
Films based on German novels
Adultery in films
Films set in Prussia
Films set in the 1880s
2000s German films